The Royal Berkshire Hospital (RBH) is a large NHS hospital in the town of Reading in the English county of Berkshire. It provides acute hospital services to the residents of the western and central portions of Berkshire, and is managed by the Royal Berkshire NHS Foundation Trust.

The hospital provides approximately 813 inpatient beds (627 acute, 66 paediatrics and 120 maternity), together with 204-day beds and spaces. In doing so, it employs over 5,000 staff and has an annual budget of £228 million.

History

The Royal Berkshire Hospital was opened in 1839 on the London Road on land donated by Henry Addington, 1st Viscount Sidmouth, a local resident and former Prime Minister. The hospital was built by local architect and builder Henry Briant, who won the design competition. King William IV took a keen interest in the hospital before it was built and as a consequence, his arms appear on the central pediment, although he died before the hospital opened. The first patron of the hospital was William's niece and successor, Queen Victoria.

In the 1860s, the original building was extended with east and west wings designed by Joseph Morris. In the 1880s, a new chapel was added to the rear of the main block, together with long side wings. Both chapel and side wings were also designed by Morris.

In 1993, the Royal Berkshire and Battle Hospitals NHS Trust was formed, to manage both the Royal Berkshire Hospital and Battle Hospital, the town's other general hospital. On 24 February 2006, The Queen accompanied by The Duke of Edinburgh opened the new buildings of the Royal Berkshire Hospital.  This was to celebrate the completion of an eight-year project to move the Battle Hospital services onto the Royal Berkshire Hospital site. In August of the same year, the trust became an NHS Foundation Trust under the name of Royal Berkshire NHS Foundation Trust, reflecting both its new status and the closure of Battle Hospital.

In 2008, the hospital was awarded 'Excellent' for its use of resources and 'Good' for the quality of its services in the Healthcare Commission's annual health check of all the hospitals within the National Health Service. The accident and emergency department is consistently one of the most efficient in the country, with more than 99% of patients being seen and treated, admitted or discharged within four hours.

In August 2010, it was reported that the number of jobs in the hospital would be reduced by 600, out of a total of around 4,000, to achieve a saving of £60 million. In October 2013, as part of a screening process by the Care Quality Commission, based on existing data and intended for use in prioritising inspections, the Trust was put into the highest risk category.

On 5 March 2020, a patient at the Royal Berkshire Hospital was the first confirmed fatality in the UK from the COVID-19 pandemic.

In August 2020, Reading’s Royal Berkshire Hospital piloted an Emergency Department for elderly and frail people.

In November 2021, the Royal Berkshire Hospital in Reading began consulting the local community about major redevelopment of the current hospital or alternatively a completely new development in a different location, to ensure that future planning and developments would cover everyone's needs.

Buildings

The hospital occupies a long thin site, running gently uphill from London Road to Addington Road, and flanked by Craven Road and Redlands Road. The buildings that house the hospital are of various ages, from the original building of 1839 to the latest ward block completed in 2015. Despite the various ages and styles of building, almost all of the hospital's departments are accessible from a single indoor pedestrian route that runs the length of the site. The original entrance on London Road still exists, but the main entrance is now situated in Craven Road, roughly at the midpoint of this route.

The original building of 1839, together with the wings added in the 1860s, are now listed grade II* by English Heritage. They are built of Bath Stone with slate roofs, and the main building comprises 2 storeys and a basement. The frontage has 11 bays, with the central 7 bays forming a projecting pedimented hexastyle portico with Ionic columns.

Berkshire Medical Heritage Centre
Amongst the buildings within the hospital complex is the old laundry, built in 1881. This now houses the museum of the Berkshire Medical Heritage Centre, which contains 3,000 artefacts relating to medicine, surgery, nursing, midwifery, pharmacy and dentistry. Some of the exhibits date back to the 17th century.

Notable patients
 In 1931, the famous fighter pilot Douglas Bader had both legs amputated in the hospital by the surgeon Leonard Joyce, after an air crash at Woodley Aerodrome.  The hospital features in the film Reach for the Sky, where these events are depicted.
 Catherine, Princess of Wales, was born at Royal Berkshire Hospital on 9 January 1982, as was her sister Pippa Middleton in 1983.
 Minder actor George Cole, best known for playing Arthur Daley died there in August 2015.

See also
 List of hospitals in England

References

Further reading

External links 

 
 Royal Berkshire Hospital on the NHS website
 Inspection reports from the Care Quality Commission

1839 establishments in England
Grade II* listed buildings in Reading
Hospital buildings completed in 1839
Hospital buildings completed in 2006
Hospitals in Berkshire
NHS hospitals in England
Hospitals established in 1839